Tom Dolezel (born August 13, 1984) is a Canadian rugby union player.

Dolezel played briefly for the Calgary Stampeders in the CFL. He played in the qualifiers for the 2015 Rugby World Cup against the  but did not make the cut for the World Cup squad due to injury.

In 2016, Tom became the head coach of the University of Western Ontario's Men's Rugby team following a season spent as Assistant Coach.

In 2018, Tom debuted with the Ontario Arrows in their first game of the season against the Houston SaberCats.

References 

Canadian rugby union players
1984 births
Canada international rugby union players
Living people
Toronto Arrows players
Rugby union props